Francisco "Kiko" Casilla Cortés (born 2 October 1986) is a Spanish professional footballer who plays as a goalkeeper for La Liga club Getafe CF.

He started playing for Real Madrid, but only represented the reserve teams in the early stage of his career. He went on to appear in 126 competitive matches for Espanyol over six La Liga seasons before returning to his previous club in 2015, with whom he won three UEFA Champions League titles as backup to Keylor Navas. In 2019–20, he won promotion to the Premier League with Leeds United.

Casilla won one cap for Spain, in 2014.

Club career

Real Madrid
Born in Alcover, Tarragona, Catalonia, Casilla did not enjoy much playing time in his two-year stint with Real Madrid reserve side, Real Madrid Castilla. In the 2005–06 season, he played in Segunda División after having graduated from the C team, being only third choice after Jordi Codina and David Cobeño.

After only four appearances, Casilla was expected to receive more opportunities after the departure of Cobeño. However, Codina became the starter and Antonio Adán, a fellow youth graduate, the backup, and Casilla ended up playing only in the last game of the campaign, with an eventual relegation befalling.

Espanyol

In August 2007, Casilla was acquired by RCD Espanyol on a free transfer. On 20 January 2008, he made his debut in La Liga in a 1–2 away loss against Real Valladolid, coming on as a substitute for injured Iñaki Lafuente two minutes after half-time as the habitual starter Carlos Kameni was away on international duty. That month, news surfaced that Arsenal were interested in acquiring the young Spaniard's services.

Barred by Kameni and new signing Cristian Álvarez, Casilla joined Segunda División B side Cádiz CF on loan for 2008–09. The move was extended for the entirety of the following campaign after the Andalusians returned to division two, and he again started most of the season, but the team was immediately relegated.

Casilla still sat on the bench for Espanyol's first game in 2010–11 but, on 31 August 2010, moved again on loan, to second division club FC Cartagena. Subsequently, returned to the Pericos, he constantly battled for first-choice status with Álvarez.

After the Argentine left, Casilla became the undisputed starter. On 1 February 2015, he was sent off against Sevilla FC for handling Iago Aspas' shot outside of the penalty area, and his replacement Pau López could not prevent an eventual 2–3 defeat.

Return to Real Madrid
On 17 July 2015, Casilla returned to Real Madrid on a five-year contract for €6 million. He made his competitive debut on 31 October, in a 3–1 win over UD Las Palmas.

Casilla played understudy to Keylor Navas in his first season, appearing in seven official matches. Two of those came in the group stage of the UEFA Champions League, as the tournament ended in conquest.

On 9 August 2016, Casilla was in goal for injured Navas in the 3–2 victory against fellow Spaniards Sevilla for the UEFA Super Cup, in Trondheim. He managed to contribute more in his second year, and the club won the national championship after a five-year wait. His Champions League input consisted of the 2–1 group phase defeat of Sporting CP, as they again emerged victorious in the competition.

Casilla made two appearances in the Champions League and 17 in all competitions during 2017–18, as Madrid won their third consecutive and 13th overall title in the tournament. In the following campaign, after the summer signing of Chelsea's Thibaut Courtois, he was further demoted down the pecking order.

Leeds United
On 17 January 2019, the 32-year-old Casilla moved abroad for the first time in his career and signed a four-and-a-half-year contract at Leeds United of the English Championship. He made his debut nine days later, in a 2–1 win against Rotherham United.

In September 2019, Casilla was accused of racially abusing Charlton Athletic forward Jonathan Leko in a match between the two teams. He was charged by The Football Association but remained available for selection during the investigation. On 28 February 2020, he received an eight-game ban and £60,000 fine after being found guilty.

Casilla played his first game in the Premier League on 16 January 2021, in a 0–1 home loss to Brighton & Hove Albion. He was second-choice to young Frenchman Illan Meslier over the season.

On 12 July 2021, Casilla was loaned to Elche CF for the next Spanish top-division season. Initially a starter, he eventually lost his place to Edgar Badia. 

Casilla's contract at Leeds was terminated by mutual consent on 31 July 2022.

Getafe
On 10 August 2022, Casilla joined Getafe CF on a one-year deal.

International career

Casilla represented Spain at under-21 level once, playing 29 minutes in a 2–0 friendly defeat of France in Benidorm. On 29 August 2014, he was called up to full side manager Vicente del Bosque's 23-man squad for matches against France and Macedonia in September, as third-choice behind Iker Casillas and David de Gea. He only made his debut, however, on 18 November, replacing the former for the last 14 minutes of a friendly with Germany in Vigo and being beaten by Toni Kroos for the game's only goal.

Career statistics

Club

International

Honours
Real Madrid
La Liga: 2016–17
Supercopa de España: 2017
UEFA Champions League: 2015–16, 2016–17, 2017–18
UEFA Super Cup: 2016, 2017
FIFA Club World Cup: 2016, 2017, 2018

Leeds United
EFL Championship: 2019–20

References

External links

Stats and bio at Cadistas1910 

1986 births
Living people
People from Alt Camp
Sportspeople from the Province of Tarragona
Spanish footballers
Footballers from Catalonia
Association football goalkeepers
La Liga players
Segunda División players
Segunda División B players
Tercera División players
Real Madrid C footballers
Real Madrid Castilla footballers
RCD Espanyol B footballers
RCD Espanyol footballers
Cádiz CF players
FC Cartagena footballers
Real Madrid CF players
Elche CF players
Getafe CF footballers
Premier League players
English Football League players
Leeds United F.C. players
UEFA Champions League winning players
Spain youth international footballers
Spain under-21 international footballers
Spain international footballers
Catalonia international footballers
Spanish expatriate footballers
Expatriate footballers in England
Spanish expatriate sportspeople in England
Race-related controversies in the United Kingdom